Come Here is Cass Fox's first full-length album release as a solo artist.
Commenting on her own album she said:
"I want this album to touch people, That’s the most important thing to me; that it connects to people and perhaps tells them that whatever it is they want to do, they can do it. If I can, anyone can. I want it to be like a comfort blanket, something they can put around them to stay sane."

Track listing

Original (2005) 

 Out of My Reach Cassandra Fox - Ruth Copeland - Clyde Darnell Wilson - P*Nut (aka John Harrison) - 3:26
 Million Dollars Cassandra Fox - Roland Armstrong - 4:00
 Save Me Cassandra Fox - Craig Stephen Dodds - 4:14
 Daddy Dear Cassandra Fox - Roland Armstrong - Peter Rinaldi - Matt Benbrook - Simon Gough - 3:46
 Come Here Cassandra Fox - Craig Stephen Dodds - Guy Farley - 3:31
 Strangers Cassandra Fox - Craig Stephen Dodds - 4:29
 Live A Little Cassandra Fox - Roland Armstrong - P*Nut (aka John Harrison) - 3:14
 Army Of One Cassandra Fox - Steve McCarthy - 3:36
 God Likes Good Lovers Cassandra Fox - Roland Armstrong - Mark Bates - 3:58
 Little Bird Cassandra Fox - Ben Langmaid - Jeffrey Michael Patterson - Mark Bates - 5:46
 Into The Blue Cassandra Fox - Matt Benbrook - 4:52
 Touch Me (Acoustic) Cassandra Fox - Rui Da Silva - 4:01

Re-package + New Versions (2006) 
 Out Of My Reach - 3:26
 Million Dollars - 4:00
 Save Me - 4:14
 Daddy Dear - 3:46
 Come Here - 3:31
 Strangers (New Version) - 4:42
 Live A Little - 3:14
 Army Of One (New Version) - 4:13
 God Likes Good Lovers - 3:58
 Little Bird - 5:46
 Touch Me (New Version) - 4:22
 Into The Blue - 4:54
* This was re-released on 6 November 2006 with the bonus track Touch Me (Spencer & Hill Radio Edit)

Notes

External links 
 Original Version Of "Come Here" Review @ rte.ie
 Re-release of "Come Here" review @ Indie London
 Re-release of "Come Here" review @ GigWise
 "Save Me" free download from cassmusic.net

2005 debut albums
Cass Fox albums
Island Records albums